Kang Il-Koo (born 26 April 1976) is a Korean handball player who competed in the 2000 Summer Olympics and in the 2008 Summer Olympics.

He is married to handballer Oh Yong-ran.

References

1976 births
Living people
South Korean male handball players
Olympic handball players of South Korea
Handball players at the 2000 Summer Olympics
Handball players at the 2008 Summer Olympics
Asian Games medalists in handball
Handball players at the 2002 Asian Games
Handball players at the 2010 Asian Games
Asian Games gold medalists for South Korea
Medalists at the 2002 Asian Games
Medalists at the 2010 Asian Games
Handball coaches of international teams